Peter Williams (22 April 188430 August 1976) was a rugby union player who represented New Zealand nine times, including a single Test match. He played club rugby for Dunedin side Alhambra, and played provincial rugby for Otago between 1908 and 1914. His sole season of international rugby was 1913, when he played in a home Test against Australia before touring North America with the All Blacksas New Zealand's international team is knownthat same year. He was selected for a tour of Australia the following year, but was unavailable and so did not play.

During World War I Williams enlisted as a gunner in the New Zealand Field Artillery in late 1914, but, following illness in Egypt in 1915, he was invalided back to New Zealand and discharged as medically unfit to serve in 1916.

Following the death of Billy Wallace in 1972, Williams held the distinction of being the oldest living All Black. He died in Mosgiel on 30 August 1976, and was buried in Geraldine Cemetery.

References 

1884 births
1976 deaths
Rugby union players from Dunedin
New Zealand international rugby union players
New Zealand rugby union players
Otago rugby union players
Rugby union hookers
New Zealand military personnel of World War I